Mordellistena fuscogemellatoides is a species of beetle in the genus Mordellistena of the family Mordellidae. It was discovered in 1977 described in 1977 by Ermisch and can be found in Bulgaria, Greece and Hungary.

References

fuscogemellatoides
Beetles described in 1977
Beetles of Europe